Cerma (Kirma) is a Gur language of Burkina Faso. It is spoken by the Gouin people (sometimes called  Ciramba ( ← Cerma-ba) or Gouin (Gwe, Gwen)).

References

Gur languages
Languages of Burkina Faso
Languages of Ivory Coast